This is a list of notable club DJs, professionals who perform, or are known to perform, at large nightclub venues or other dance events, or who have been pioneers in the development of the role of the club DJ. DJs play a mix of recorded music for an audience at a bar, nightclub, dance club or rave who dance to the music. The music is played through a sound reinforcement system.

DJs who use their real names are listed alphabetically by last name; DJs who use stage names are listed alphabetically by their first name.

#
3 Are Legend
3LAU (real name Justin Blau), American progressive house and electro house DJ and producer.

A

A-Trak
Above & Beyond, English trance trio composed by Jonathan "Jono" Grant, Tony McGuinness and Paavo Siljamäki.
Adam Beyer Famous Swedish techno DJ and producer and boss of the influential Drumcode Records label.
Acid Maria (real name Angelika Lepper), one of the first house DJs at Munich club Ultraschall; prominent female techno DJ.
Adventure Club
Aero Chord
Afrojack (real name Nick van de Wall), Dutch House DJ/Producer
Alan Walker (real name Alan Olav Walker) Norwegian DJ & record Producer born in Northampton, United Kingdom
Albatraoz
Alesso
Alexander Perls
Alice Deejay
Alison Wonderland
All Hail the Silence
Alle Benassi
Alok
Alvaro
Amelie Lens Belgian DJ
André Marques Brazilian DJ, TV presenter and Actor.
Angger Dimas Indonesian electronic musician, DJ/Producer, called the #1 DJ of Indonesia by thedjlist.com
Aphex Twin
Applehead (Scott Caldwell)

Armin van Buuren (born 1976), Dutch trance DJ/producer. The only DJ who has been named number one DJ in the world 5 times on DJ Magazine's Top 100 DJ poll
Armand van Helden, a prominent funk & house DJ-producer prominent during the late-90s. Best known for his track "You Don't Know Me"
AronChupa
ATB (real name André Tanneberger, born 1973), German Trance & Light Trance DJ/Producer
Audien (real name Nate Rathbun, born 1992) American Trance & House DJ/producer known for Pompeii remix
Avicii (real name Tim Bergling, 1989–2018), Swedish house DJ/producer best known for the track "Levels"
Axwell (real name Axel Hedfors, born 1977), Swedish house DJ/producer best known as a member of the Swedish House Mafia
Axwell & Ingrosso
Andrew Rayel (born 1992), Moldovan Trance DJ/Producer
Ansolo American DJ/producer and actor who portrayed Augustus Waters in The Fault In Our Stars

B
Brooks (DJ) (real name Thijs Westbroek), Dutch DJ, record producer & electronic musician from Eindhoven
Bass Bumpers (also known as CJ Stone, and Bad Habit Boys), German Trance and techno DJ group
Bass Hunter
Bassjackers
Bassnectar
Basto
Ben Klock German techno DJ and resident at Berlin's Berghain nightclub. 
Benassi Bros.
Benny Benassi
Randy Bettis
Bicep
Bingo Players
Björk
Black Coffee (Nkosinathi Innocent Maphumulo, born 11 March 1976), better known by his stage name Black Coffee, is a South African DJ, record producer, singer and songwriter).
Blasterjaxx, (Thom Jongkind and Idir Makhlaf), Dutch Electro House and Big Room House
The Bloody Beetroots
Bob Sinclar (born Christophe Le Friant; 10 May 1969), French record producer, house music DJ, remixer, he is a two time DJ Awards winner and also the owner of the label Yellow Productions.
Boombox Cartel
Boom Jinx (real name Øistein Johan Eide), composer, producer and DJ from Norway
Borgeous
Borgore
Boris Brejcha
Mark Brain
Bro Safari

C
CamelPhat, British DJ and production duo, consisting of Dave Whelan and Mike Di Scala
Calvin Harris (real name Adam Wiles, born 1984), Scottish DJ/producer
Carnage (real name Diamanté Anthony Blackmon, born January 3, 1991), Guatemalan-American DJ and record producer
Caspa (real name Gary McCann, born May 30, 1982), dubstep music producer from West London
The Chainsmokers
Chris Liebing, German DJ known for playing a decisive role in shaping the hardcore techno genre Schranz.
Chris Lake
Chuckie (real name Clyde Sergio Narain), Dutch House DJ/Producer
Claptone
Cosmic Gate, German Progressive Trance, electronic DJ/Producer
Cash Cash
The Chemical Brothers, duo DJs from UK.
Carl Cox (born 1962), genres include house, tech house, techno, minimal techno winner of DJ Magazine's Worlds No. 1 DJ  Award in 1996 and 1997 he is also an 11 time DJ Awards winner.
Cesqeaux (real name Daniel Francesco Tuparia), Dutch DJ/producer
The Crystal Method, duo DJs from America, known for their "Vegas" CD
Cristoph UK prog and melodic master.
Chris Leão (Real name Christian Leão), electronic music producer and Brazilian DJ.

D
DVBBS
DJ D-Sol (D-Sol)
DallasK
Danny Dyer alias Pwoper Nawty (born 1977), DJ and MC
Danny Rampling, widely credited as one of the original founders of the UK's rave/club scene. He was the first No 1 DJ in the world voted by the staff of DJ Magazine in 1991 in 1997 the top 100 poll became a public vote.
Danny Tenaglia "Daniel" (born March 7, 1961), New York-based DJ and Grammy nominated record producer he is also a 3 time IDMA winner and 3 time DJ Awards winner
Darren Styles (real name Darren James Mew)
Darude (real name Ville Virtanen, born 1975), originally from Finland.
Datsik
David Grutman

David Guetta, French DJ
David Mancuso, (born October 20, 1944), DJ/Promoter created the popular "by invitation only" parties in New York City known as "The Loft Parties" many famous private discothèques/clubs of the '70s and '80s were modeled after The Loft, including the Paradise Garage, The Gallery, and The Saint.
David Morales (born 21 August 1961), internationally acclaimed Grammy-winning American house music DJ and producer.
David Vendetta
Deadmau5 (real name Joel Thomas Zimmerman, born 1981), Canadian House DJ/Producer.
Dillon Francis
Diplo, American DJ, record producer, rapper, singer, songwriter and record executive (Also works in collaboration with Skrillex as Jack Ü)
Dirty South
Deorro
Derrick Carter
Derrick May
Detroit Grand Pubahs
DJ Boston
Djsky, Lebanese International Dj  In an interview with Watsup TV, Djsky revealed he was the first to introduce Electronic Music Dance into Ghana music.
DJ Casper (real name Willie Perry Jr., born 31 May 1971) (is an American songwriter and DJ.)
DJ Hell, Internationally acclaimed German DJ and boss of International Deejay Gigolos. His DJ performance has been portrayed in the film 196 BPM.
DJ Icey
DJ Koze German techno DJ and producer
DJ Snake
John Digweed DJ, who travels all over the world and is producer, record label owner and artist
Doctor P (real name Shaun Brockhurst, born 9 April 1986), British Dubstep DJ.
Don Diablo (real name Don Pepijn Schipper, born 27 February 1980), Dutch Electronic Dance DJ
Donald Glover (also known as: Childish Gambino) (Donald McKinley Glover Jr. is an American actor, comedian, singer, writer, producer, director, rapper, songwriter, and DJ. He performs music under the stage name Childish Gambino and as a DJ under the name mcDJ.)
DJ Dougal (real name Paul Arnold Clarke; born 1975), British hardcore and happy hardcore artist and DJ
Dimitri Vegas & Like Mike
Daft Punk French Electronic music duo
Duke Dumont (Adam George Dyment, better known by his stage name Duke Dumont, is a British DJ and music producer born August 27, 1982).
Duck Sauce, Nu Disco Producer
D-Wayne
Dynoro
Dyro

E
Eiffel 65
Emmanuel Top (born 1971), French House / Acid DJ and Producer
Eric Prydz
Erick Morillo (1971–2020) American DJ, music producer and record label owner, a six-time DJ Awards winner; he also helped in the production of the famous dance hit "Move It" by Reel 2 Real.
Eptic 
Excision (dubstep producer)

F

Fatboy Slim (real name Norman Cook, born 1963), British DJ
Fedde Le Grand, Dutch DJ
Fergie (real name Robert Ferguson, born 1979) Northern Irish DJ
Ferry Corsten Dutch DJ
Flight Facilities Australian DJ duo
Flume_(musician) Australian DJ, known for his grammy winning album Skin_(Flume_album)
Flux Pavilion 
Frankie Bones (real name Frank Mitchell, born 1966), first American DJ who played the early U.K. scene in the late 80s
Frankie Knuckles (real name Francis Nicholls, 1955–2014), helped to develop and popularize the electronic, disco-influenced dance music style called house music
Freemasons (real name Russell Small and James Wiltshire)
Frankie Cutlass (real name Frank Malave, born 1971), American DJ

G
Gabriel & Dresden (duo of Josh Gabriel and Dave Dresden, born 2001), their blend of house and progressive trance led to multiple Billboard number 1 hits.
Galantis
getter
The Glitch Mob
Glowinthedark
Goldie (a.k.a. Clifford Joseph Price) (born 1965), U.K. DJ
Green Velvet
GTA
Laurent Garnier (born 1966), French DJ and original Quadrant Park resident DJ.

H

Hardwell (real name Robbert van de Corput)  Dutch progressive house and electro house DJ and music producer
Dave Harris
Headhunterz (real name Willem Rebergen), DJ from the Netherlands

I
Illenium
Sebastian Ingrosso (born 1983), Swedish DJ/producer; former member of the Swedish House Mafia

J
Jack Beats
Jack Ü
Jack Wins Dj.
James Hype British DJ
Jax Jones British DJ
Jay Hardway
Jazzy M, British DJ
Jeff Mills (born 1963) techno DJ
Jeffrey Jey
Jellybean Benitez (born 1957), Disco and House Music DJ, remixer and music producer
Jewelz & Sparks
Jillionaire
Joey Dale
John Digweed (born 1967), British progressive house DJ.
Jonas Blue (born 1989), British DJ, songwriter, record producer and remixer.
Joris Voorn (born 1997), Dutch house DJ and producer, who plays a mixture of techno, progressive and deep house styles.
Judge Jules (real name Julius O'Riordan, born 1965), UK house/trance DJs, who has a radio show on BBC Radio 1
Junior Vasquez (born 1980), NYC House DJ from the late 80s to early 2000s
Julian Jordan 
DJ Jurgen
Justice, French Electronic music duo
Justin Prime

K
Kaskade (real name Ryan Raddon, born 1972), American DJ and formerly an A&R assistant with Om Records.
Kato (real name Thomas Kato Vittrup), Danish DJ
Kayzo
Ken Ishii (ケン・イシイ) Japanese techno DJ and producer from Sapporo. He graduated from Hitotsubashi University. He has released work under his own name as well as under the pseudonyms: FLR, Flare, UTU, Yoga, and Rising Sun.
Kenneth G
DJ Khaled
Kill the Noise
Klayton
Knife Party
Krewella
DJ Kura (real name Ruben de Almeida, born 1987), Portuguese DJ and music producer
Kutski
KSHMR American DJ  
Kygo (real name Kyrre Gørvell-Dahll (born 1991)), Norwegian DJ
Kylian Mash (born 1983), French DJ and Record Producer, known for hits, such as Club Certified and No Tomorrow

L
Steve Lawler, British house music producer and DJ born in Birmingham, England he is a five time DJ Awards winner. He currently runs the record label VIVa MUSiC. He also founded the now defunct Harlem Records.
Laidback Luke (real name Lucas Cornelis van Scheppingen, born 1976), Filipino-born Dutch DJ
Larry Levan (1954–1992), early and prolific re-mixer and the DJ at the 1970s discothèque The Paradise Garage
Lenny Fontana, American house music DJ from New York City.
Ian Levine, pioneering producer, label owner and DJ of the Hi-NRG sound during 1980s UK.
Lil Jon, American rapper and Dj.
Lisa Lashes, British DJ born in Leicester, England.
LMFAO
Luna-C

M
Madeon (real name Hugo Pierre Leclercq), French DJ, "Finale" was used as theme song for video game PlayStation All-Stars Battle Royale 
Major Lazer
MAKJ
Mako
Malaa
Marcel Dettmann German techno DJ and resident at Berlin's Berghain nightclub. 
Marshmello (real name Christopher Comstock), American DJ/producer
Martin Garrix (real name Martijn Gerard Garritsen), Dutch DJ/producer
Matthew Koma
Mathieu Koss
Mauro Picotto (born December 25, 1966), Italian electronic music producer and DJ, and previously a member of the Italian Euro house group "R.A.F.".
Mason (band), Dutch music producer duo
Mesto (real name Melle Stomp) Dutch DJ and Producer
Mike Williams (DJ) (real name Mike Willemsen) Dutch DJ and record producer,
Miki Love
Michael Gray
Michael K (real name Michal Kopij) (born September 29, 1990), Polish Electro/House DJ
Michael Woods
Miss Kittin Famous French club DJ, producer, live performer and pioneer of the Electroclash genre. 
Miss Monique (real name Alessia Akrusha), Ukrainian female techno, progressive house and trance DJ
MistaJam (real name Pete Dalton), famous DJ who has a show on 1Xtra
Giorgio Moroder (born 1940), influential Italian record producer, songwriter, performer and DJ who won several Academy Awards, Grammys and other awards, is frequently credited with pioneering synthesizer disco and electronic dance music
Monika Kruse Internationally acclaimed German techno and house DJ since the 1990s and label boss of Terminal M. 
MOTi
Mr. Oizo (real name Quentin Dupieux), French DJ/Electro Producer and film director
Martin Solveig (French DJ)

N

Nicky Romero (real name Nick Rotteveel) Dutch DJ and house music composer/producer
Nicky Siano former resident DJ at Studio 54 New York and The Gallery Chicago.
Nina Kraviz Russian DJ and disk Jockey
NERVO, Australian DJ and songwriters
Nora En Pure (real name Daniela Niederer) South African-Swiss DJ and deep house producer

O
Oliver Heldens (HI-LO)
Ookay
Orjan Nilsen

P

The Partysquad
DJ Paulette, (real name Paulette Constable born 22 December 1966), original resident DJ @ Flesh, The Haçienda and Radio FG presenter.
Paul Oakenfold (born 1963), British record producer and remixer two-time winner of DJ Magazine's World's No. 1 DJ in 1998 and 1999.
Paul Rudd (DJ) (born 1979), British DJ, songwriter, record producer, recording artist, label owner and remixer.
Paul van Dyk (real name Mathias Paul; born 1971), German trance DJ who earned DJMag's top 100 DJ list No. 1 DJ award in 2005 and again in 2006
The Prodigy, British electronic music group formed by Liam Howlett in 1990.
Pedro Cazanova (real name Pedro Penedo Dj/Producer from Lisbon Portugal)

Q
Quintino (Dutch EDM Dj)
Quentin Harris

R
Redfoo, American rapper and DJ.
Roger Sanchez (The DJ of DJs), Grammy Award winner, four time DJ Awards recipient, and MTV Europe Music Awards nominee.
R3hab (real name Fadil El Ghoul), Dutch DJ and record producer of Moroccan and Algerian origin.
Ricardo Villalobos, German DJ known for minimal techno, repeatedly came first in Resident Advisor's Top 100 DJs of the year list.
Richie Hawtin, Detroit techno pioneer, leading exponent of minimal techno since the mid 1990s, founder of Minus Records, arguably the largest and best-known techno label
Richie Kidd
Robert Miles (real name Roberto Concina, 1969-2017), Italian DJ, composer, and producer most famous for the seminal trance track "Children"
Ron Hardy
Ross Mitchell, South African DJ producer based in London, UK. Noted for mixing techno, house, and drum & bass.
Porter Robinson (born 1992)
Robin Schulz
Ran-D (real name Randy Wieland, born 18 May 1981 in Zeeland) is a Dutch DJ and music producer. His genre is hardstyle.

S
Salvatore Ganacci
Steve Angello (full name Steven Angello Josefsson Fragogiannis, born 1982), Greek-born Swedish DJ/producer; member of the Swedish House Mafia
Steve Aoki
Sash!, German DJ production team
Sasha (born Alexander Paul Coe 1969), British DJ, record producer and Grammy Award nominee. He was voted World No. 1 DJ by DJ Magazine in 2000 he is a 4 time International Dance Music Awards winner and 4 time DJ Awards winner.
Sander van Doorn (real name Sander Ketelaars), Dutch Trance DJ
Sandra Collins (American DJ/Producer Electronic Dance Music) 
Sandro Silva
SebastiAn (real name Sebastian Akchoté-Bozovic)
Showtek (Sjoerd and Wouter Janssen), Electronic dance music, progressive/electro house
Sidney Samson, DJ best known for his Dutch House
Skazi, Israeli DJ/producer duo composed of Asher Swissa and Assaf B-Bass, famous for mixing trance with rock music
Skrillex (real name Sonny John Moore), American electronic dance music producer, DJ, singer, songwriter and multi-instrumentalist. (Also works in collaboration with Diplo as Jack Ü)
Sky Blu, American rapper and Dj.
Slushii (real name Julian Scanlan), American electronic dance music producer and DJ.
Smokin Jo (real name Joanne Joseph), playing style genres include house, techno, deep house the only female to win DJ Magazine's Worlds No 1 DJ award in 1992.
DJ Snake
Solomun German house and techno DJ, producer and three-time DJ Awards winner. 
Sophie Francis 
starRo, Grammy nominated Japanese producer / DJ
Swedish House Mafia, Swedish supergroup consisting of Axwell, Steve Angello, and Sebastian Ingrosso. (Active)
Sander Kleinenberg
Daz Saund, British Indian club DJ and Remixer from London, England. OriginalTrade resident DJ. 
Sven Väth, DJ known as "Papa Sven" in Germany's techno scene and three time DJ Awards winner. His longest set has been 30 hours.

T

Tale Of Us
Tallulah, London DJ that had a career spanning over 35 years
Tanith Influential techno DJ and Tresor resident who is considered one of the founders of the German techno culture.
Tchami
Tee Scott (real name Marc Allen Scott), disco DJ at the NYC club Better Days from 1976–1981, then resident at Zanzibar, and remixer of many classics
The Advent, Techno DJ/Producer
Tiësto (real name Tijs Michiel Verwest), Dutch trance, electro house, and techno DJ
Tiga
Jean F. Cochois, aka Timewriter
TJR, (musician), EDM producer, American DJ
Tommy Trash (real name Thomas Olsen), Australian DJ known for producing house music
Pete Tong, BBC Radio One DJ as well as Frequent Club Performer
Tonka (real name Thomas-René Gerlach), German electronic music artist (DJ and Re mixer).
Tony De Vit pioneering Hard House Hard NRG DJ and resident of the infamous Trade Club London voted as one of the Top 10 DJ's of all time by Mix Magazine UK in 2011.
Tony Humphries, 35-year veteran of the NYC club scene and a former resident at New Jersey nightclub Zanzibar
Tony Junior
Tom Novy German house DJ and producer since the 1990s
Tom Swoon, best known Polish progressive house DJ
Tomcraft German techno DJ and producer, most known for his track Loneliness
Trentemøller
DJ Trevi
Tritonal, American DJ's/producers

U
Umek (real name Uroš Umek), Slovenian dance-music composer and DJ
Ummet Ozcan, Turkish-Dutch DJ and producer

W

Walshy Fire
W&W
Wildstylez (real name Joram Metekohy), DJ from the Netherlands
Wolfgang Gartner (DJ) Originally from Texas, US
WestBam (real name Maximilian Lenz), DJ from Germany
Will Sparks Australian DJ, best known for playing Melbourne bounce
Willy William

X
X-Press 2

Y
Yves V, Belgian DJ/producer
Yellow Claw, trap producers

Z
Zomboy (real name Joshua Mellody), British DJ and producer
Zaeden (real name Sahil Sharma), Indian DJ and music producer
Zedd (real name Anton Zaslavski), Russian-German DJ and musician
Zeds Dead, Canadian DJ duo and producers

See also
Styles of house music
List of deep house music artists
List of progressive house artists
List of electronic music record labels
List of electro house artists
List of electronic music genres
List of electronic music festivals
List of house music artists
List of tropical house music artists

References

 
Lists of entertainers
Lists of people by occupation